The men's track time trial cycling event at the 1988 Summer Olympics took place on 20 September and was one of the nine cycling events at the 1984 Olympics. There were 30 cyclists from 30 nations, with each nation limited to one competitor. The event was won by Aleksandr Kirichenko of the Soviet Union, the nation's first victory in the men's track time trial. Martin Vinnicombe's silver was Australia's first medal in the event since 1972, while Robert Lechner put West Germany on the podium for the second consecutive Games with his bronze.

Background

This was the 15th appearance of the event, which had previously been held in 1896 and every Games since 1928. It would be held every Games until being dropped from the programme after 2004. The returning cyclists from 1980 were silver medalist Curt Harnett of Canada, fourth-place finisher Gene Samuel of Trinidad and Tobago, seventh-place finisher Marcelo Alexandre of Argentina, sixteenth-place finisher Max Leiva of Guatemala, twentieth-place finisher Rosman Alwi of Malaysia, and twenty-second-place finisher Lee Fu-hsiang of Chinese Taipei. The favorite was Australian Martin Vinnicombe, who had won the 1987 world championship after third and second place finishes in 1985 and 1986. Other contestants included Maic Malchow of East Germany, who had set the world record in 1986.

Liechtenstein and Spain each made their debut in the men's track time trial. France made its 15th appearance, having competed at every appearance of the event. For the first time, Great Britain did not compete.

Competition format

The event was a time trial on the track, with each cyclist competing separately to attempt to achieve the fastest time. Each cyclist raced one kilometre from a standing start.

Records

The following were the world and Olympic records prior to the competition.

No new world or Olympic records were set during the competition.

Schedule

All times are Korea Standard Time adjusted for daylight savings (UTC+10)

Results

References

Cycling at the Summer Olympics – Men's track time trial
Track cycling at the 1988 Summer Olympics
Men's events at the 1988 Summer Olympics